Timothy McAuliffe (1 February 1909 – 29 September 1985) was a Labour Party and politician from County Westmeath in Ireland. He was a senator for 18 years between 1961 and 1983.

Born in Corbetown, near Edenderry in County Offaly, McAuliffe was a schoolteacher in Milltownpass, County Westmeath.

In 1961, he was elected to the 10th Seanad Éireann on the Cultural and Educational Panel, and held the seat until his defeat at the 1969 election to the 12th Seanad. He stood twice as a candidate for Dáil Éireann, at the 1965 and 1969 general elections, but was unsuccessful on both occasions.

McAuliffe was re-elected in the 1973 election to the 13th Seanad, and held the seat until he stood down at 1983 election. His daughter Helena McAuliffe-Ennis was selected by the Labour Party to stand on the Cultural and Educational Panel, and won the seat – though she later joined to the Progressive Democrats.

References

1909 births
1985 deaths
Labour Party (Ireland) senators
Members of the 10th Seanad
Members of the 11th Seanad
Members of the 13th Seanad
Members of the 14th Seanad
Members of the 15th Seanad
Members of the 16th Seanad
Politicians from County Offaly
Politicians from County Westmeath